The Asturias tournament is the previous round of the Copa RFEF in Asturias. Organized by the Royal Asturias Football Federation, the Asturian teams in Segunda División B and the best teams of the Tercera División (Group 2) non qualified to the Copa del Rey (making a total of 12 teams) play this tournament, including farm teams. Real Sporting is the only team who never played the Copa Federación due to playing in higher divisions.

Format
The tournament is played between July and October, and the champion of the tournament qualifies to the National tournament of the Copa RFEF. Since 1999, the final is played in only one game and since 2001, the qualifying round is composed by four groups of three teams where the four group winners qualify for the semifinals.

The first edition was held in 1994 and was won by Club Siero.

Since 2019, reserve teams were excluded of the competition.

History

Champions

Performance of Asturian teams in the National tournament
In bold, teams qualified as Regional champions.

References

External links
Asturian Football Federation
Results at old Marino Luanco website

Football in Asturias
Asturias